The Swan 62 was designed by German Frers and first launched in 2000s as an evolution of the Swan 60 it alongside the Swan 82 marked the launch of the raised saloon concept within Nautor Swan.

External links
 Nautor Swan
 German Frers Official Website

References

Sailing yachts
Keelboats
2000s sailboat type designs
Sailboat types built by Nautor Swan
Sailboat type designs by Germán Frers